Otto Paajanen (born September 13, 1992) is a Finnish professional ice hockey player. He is currently playing for HIFK of the Liiga.

Paajanen made his Liiga debut playing with HPK during the 2011–12 Liiga season. Paajanen has represented Finland at U20 level.

References

External links

1992 births
Living people
People from Loppi
Finnish ice hockey centres
HIFK (ice hockey) players
HPK players
KooKoo players
Leksands IF players
Sportspeople from Kanta-Häme